1992 in Ghana details events of note that happened in Ghana in the year 1992.

Incumbents
 President: Jerry John Rawlings
 Chief Justice: Philip Edward Archer

Events

January

February

March
6th  - 35th independence anniversary held.

April
28th - final draft constitution of Ghana is unanimously approved in a referendum.

May
8th - Jerry Rawlings Chairman of the Provisional National Defence Council (PNDC) accepts oaths to be sworn by government officials.
18th - Ban on political party activities lifted.

June

July
1st - Republic day celebrations held across the country.

August

September

October

November
3rd - Presidential elections held across the country.

December
Annual Farmers' Day celebrations held in all regions of the country.
29th - parliamentary elections held.

Births
 1 January: Daniel Kofi Agyei, footballer
 5 January: Afriyie Acquah, footballer
 10 January: Christian Atsu, footballer
 11 July: Joseph Baffo, footballer
 1 December: Masahudu Alhassan, footballer
 19 December: Bright Addae, footballer

Deaths

National holidays
 1 January: New Year's Day
 6 March: Independence Day
 1 May: Labor Day
 25 December: Christmas
 26 December: Boxing day

In addition, several other places observe local holidays, such as the foundation of their town. These are also "special days."

References